Dorcadion ledereri is a species of beetle in the family Cerambycidae. It was described by Thomson in 1865. It is known from Turkey and Iran.

See also 
Dorcadion

References

ledereri
Beetles described in 1865